State Route 172 (SR 172) is a state highway in the U.S. state of California in Tehama County.  It is a loop route off of State Route 36 that serves the Mill Creek area of Lassen National Forest.

Route description
SR 172 begins at a junction with SR 36 in Mineral and heads southeast through Lassen National Forest. The route then turns south, crossing the South Fork Battle Creek and entering a wooded area. The road then winds eastward through the forest, roughly parallel to Mill Creek. SR 172 then turns northward along Mill Creek and heads back toward SR 36 in Morgan Springs, its eastern terminus.

The segment between Mineral and Mill Creek is not plowed during the winter and thus is typically closed during snowy conditions.

SR 172 is not part of the National Highway System, a network of highways that are considered essential to the country's economy, defense, and mobility by the Federal Highway Administration.

Major intersections

See also

References

External links

 California @ AARoads.com - State Route 172
 Caltrans: Route 172 highway conditions

 California Highways: SR 172

172
State Route 172